Tang-i-Panj (also known as Tang Panj; also known as Nīk Panch) is a village in Tang-e Haft Rural District, Papi District, Khorramabad County, Lorestan Province, Iran. At the 2006 census, its population was 467, in 98 families.

References 

Towns and villages in Khorramabad County